State Route 67 (SR 67) is a  state highway that runs south-to-north through portions of Bryan, Bulloch, and Jenkins counties in the east-central part of the U.S. state of Georgia. The route connects Fort Stewart and Pembroke with Millen, via Statesboro.

Route description
The highway travels northwest, through rural areas of the county, into Pembroke. It curve to the north-northeast to an intersection with US 280/SR 30 (East Bacon Street). At this intersection both SR 67 and  SR 119 join that concurrency. One block later, SR 67 splits off to the north, while SR 119 splits off to the south. SR 67 continues to the northwest, leaving town and crosses into Bulloch County. The highway continues to the northwest and has an interchange with Interstate 16 (I-16), that’s where SR 46 west begins, just before entering Denmark. In Denmark, it intersects SR 46 west. It passes through rural areas of the county, until it enters Statesboro. In town, it intersects US 301 Bypass/SR 67 Bypass/SR 73 Bypass (Veterans Memorial Parkway), at the southeastern edge of Georgia Southern University. It runs along the northeastern edge of the university, before meeting US 25/US 301/SR 73 (South Main Street). The four highway head concurrent to the north. At East Main Street, they intersect the western terminus of SR 24. In the main part of town, they intersect US 80/SR 26. There, US 301/SR 73 split off to the north and northeast, while US 25/US 80/SR 26/SR 67 head northwest. Just after leaving town, they meet US 25 Bypass/SR 67 Bypass. In Hopeulikit, US 80/SR 26 split off to the southwest. Here, US 25/SR 67 continue to the northwest and enter Jenkins County. A little distance before entering Millen, first SR 121 and then SR 23 join the concurrency. Just after entering Millen, SR 17 Bypass (South Gray Street) joins the concurrency. The five routes head concurrent into the main part of town. At SR 17 (Winthrope Avenue), SR 17 Bypass ends, US 25/SR 121 continue to the north, and SR 17/SR 23/SR 67 head concurrent to the east. At Masonic Street, SR 17 splits off to the south, and SR 23 splits off to the north. SR 67 continues to the east, passing the Jenkins County Hospital. Then, it continue to the east until it meets its northern terminus, an intersection with SR 21 (Millen Bypass), just east of town.

The following portions of SR 67 are part of the National Highway System, a system of routes determined to be the most important for the nation's economy, mobility, and defense:
From the southern end of the US 280/SR 30/SR 119 concurrency, in Pembroke, to the I-16 interchange, south-southeast of Denmark
From the southern end of the US 25/US 301/SR 73 concurrency, in Statesboro, to the northern end of the US 25, SR 17 Byp., and SR 121 concurrencies, in Millen

History 

In 1989, a bypass of Millen was proposed; six years later, SR 21 was shifted there and SR 67 was extended beyond Millen.

Major intersections

Statesboro bypass

State Route 67 Bypass (SR 67 Byp.) is a  bypass route of SR 67 that exists entirely within the central part of Bulloch County. The southern part is located within the Statesboro city limits. It is entirely concurrent with U.S. Route 25 Bypass (US 25 Byp.) and is also partially concurrent with US 301 Byp./SR 73 Byp. The entire length of US 25 Byp./SR 67 Byp. and US 301 Byp./SR 73 Byp. is known as Veterans Memorial Parkway.

It begins at an intersection with the SR 67 mainline (Fair Road) in the southeastern part of Statesboro. At this intersection, SR 67 Byp. begins a concurrency with US 301 Byp./SR 73 Byp. (Veterans Memorial Parkway) to the west. The three highways skirt along the southern edge of Georgia Southern University until they intersect US 25/US 301/SR 73 (South Main Street). At this intersection, US 301 Byp./SR 73 Byp. end, and US 25 Bypass begins. The two highways leave the city limits and skirt around the western side of the city until they meet their northern terminus, an intersection with US 25/US 80/SR 26/SR 67 just northwest of the town.

The entire length of SR 67 Byp. is part of the National Highway System, a system of routes determined to be the most important for the nation's economy, mobility, and defense.

See also

References

External links

 Georgia Roads (Routes 61 - 80)

067
Transportation in Bryan County, Georgia
Transportation in Bulloch County, Georgia
Transportation in Jenkins County, Georgia